Clymene or Klymenê (from Greek name  "famous woman") may refer to:

Clymene (mythology), the name of several figures in Greek mythology, including:
Clymene (wife of Iapetus)
Clymene (mother of Phaethon)
Clymene (alga), a genus of red algae in the family Bangiaceae
104 Klymene, an asteroid
Clymene dolphin (Stenella clymene), a dolphin endemic to the Atlantic Ocean
Clymene moth (Haploa clymene), a moth of eastern North America